Dimitrie Ralet (1817 – October 25, 1858) was a Moldavian prose writer, playwright and poet.

His parents were Alexandru Ralet, a spătar of Botoșani, and Maria, the daughter of baron Teodor Mustață, a wealthy merchant from Bukovina. He reportedly studied in Poland, and his first published work, the short volume of translations Plăcerea sâmțirei, appeared in 1837. In 1841, he became president of the Botoșani tribunal, but soon abandoned a career for which he did not have a calling. He was director of the Justice Department under Grigore Alexandru Ghica in 1849, Minister of Religious Affairs and Education in 1854 and secretary of the ad-hoc divan in 1857. A prominent supporter of the Moldavian Revolution of 1848, he joined the unionist committee in 1856. He died in Botoșani, of tuberculosis.

Ralet was a talented dilettante who wrote an enjoyable prose in which the sharpness of his observations is made more powerful by the moralist's indulgent irony: Suvenire și impresii de călătorie în România, Bulgaria, Constantinopole (1858). This was the only book he wrote: although deeply cultured, he was reticent with other people and frightened of exposing himself to the public. The work covers a journey he took between July 1855 and March 1856; he and Costache Negri were sent on what turned out to be a successful diplomatic mission to Constantinople. By the time a new edition appeared in 1979, it had been largely forgotten.

Notes

1817 births
1858 deaths
Romanian nobility
Romanian translators
Romanian travel writers
19th-century Romanian judges
Romanian revolutionaries
People of the Revolutions of 1848
19th-century deaths from tuberculosis
Tuberculosis deaths in Romania
19th-century translators